Grant Charles Wells (born August 23, 1971) is a retired international rugby union player for the United States national team. He made 12 official appearances for the USA Eagles following his test match debut on May 27, 2000.

Career 
Wells was born in Christchurch, New Zealand. He made San Francisco his permanent home in the 1990s soon after joining the Golden Gate Rugby Club, which later merged to become San Francisco Golden Gate RFC.

Following his selection for the USA Eagles in 2000, he played as the starting fly-half in the Pacific Rim Rugby Championship and on the team's autumn tour of Scotland and Wales. In 2001, Wells played in the Pan American Championship before making his final test match appearance at home in San Francisco against England.

Post-retirement 
After his retirement from professional rugby, Wells became an assistant coach for the San Francisco Golden Gate team.

References

United States international rugby union players
American rugby union players
American rugby union coaches
New Zealand rugby union players
Rugby union fly-halves
Living people
1971 births